The Germanos Group is a Greek holding company based in Athens, Greece.

History
The Group started as a battery shop in Athens in 1980 and since then has expanded into retail when it opened its first store by the same year. 
In 2003 Germanos in a joint operation with Folli Follie bought a 40% stake of the Hellenic Duty Free shops. 
In 2006 it was acquired by Cosmoholding Cyprus Ltd., a subsidiary of the mobile operator Cosmote.

Battery manufacturing
Germanos Group's focus is battery manufacturing for vehicles and electronic devices, while the retail part of electronic goods is given to the chain of stores by the same name.

Environment
The Germanos Group has been operating a battery recycling program called Dias Bat since 2004. In every Germanos Store batteries are collected and given for recycling, thus reducing the negative effect of battery consumption to the environment.

Subsidiaries
Germanos (chain of stores)
e-value

International expansion

The Germanos group through its subsidiary's chain of stores has expanded into Cyprus as well as in Eastern Europe:
North Macedonia (sold to Telekom Slovenije)
Poland
Romania
Ukraine

References

External links
Germanos Group website (in Greek)

Retail companies of Greece
Companies based in Athens
Greek brands